Qaemiyeh-ye Sofla (also Romanized as Qā’emīyeh-ye Soflá; also known as Qā’emīyeh) is a village in Dabuy-ye Jonubi Rural District, Dabudasht District, Amol County, Mazandaran Province, Iran. At the 2006 census, its population was 304, in 75 families.

References 

Populated places in Amol County